Lewisporte is a defunct provincial electoral district for the House of Assembly of Newfoundland and Labrador, Canada. As of 2011, there are 7,797 eligible voters living within the district. The district was abolished in 2015 and replaced by Lewisporte-Twillingate.

The town of Lewisporte has been a major service centre in this northeastern district, and has many of the votes. Until the 2003 shipping season, it was the southern terminus of the Labrador coastal ferry service. The economy is traditionally dependent on the fishery but farming is also important.

Lewisporte district also includes the communities of Alderburn, Baytona, Birchy Bay, Boyd's Cove, Brown's Arm, Campbellton, Comfort Cove-Newstead, Embree, Horwood, Laurenceton, Little Burnt Bay, Loon Bay, Mason's Cove, Michael's Harbour, Norris Arm, Notre Dame Junction, Port Albert, Porterville, Sandy Point, Stanhope and Stoneville.

Members of the House of Assembly
The district has elected the following Members of the House of Assembly:
The district has elected the following Members of the House of Assembly:

Election results 

|-

|-
 
|NDP
|Lloyd Snow
|align="right"|988
|align="right"|22.82%
|align="right"|
|-

|}

|-

|-

|-
 
|NDP
|Garry Vatcher
|align="right"|460
|align="right"|12.21%
|align="right"|
|}

|-

|-

|-

|Independent
|Garry Vatcher
|align="right"|159
|align="right"|3.22%
|align="right"|
|}

|-

|-

|-
 
|NDP
|Michael Dwyer
|align="right"|125
|align="right"|2.1%
|align="right"|
|}

References

External links 
Website of the Newfoundland and Labrador House of Assembly

Newfoundland and Labrador provincial electoral districts
1975 establishments in Newfoundland and Labrador
2015 disestablishments in Newfoundland and Labrador